The 2018 NCAA Division I women's basketball tournament began on March 16, 2018, and concluded with the national championship game on Sunday, April 1. The Final Four was played at Nationwide Arena in Columbus, Ohio. This is the third time that the women's Final Four was played in Ohio after previously being held in Cincinnati in 1997 and Cleveland in 2007 and the first time that the women's Final Four was played in Columbus. For only the fourth time in the tournament’s 37-year history, all four of the number one seeds made it to the Final Four (1989, 2012, 2015).

Tennessee continued its record streak of making every NCAA women's basketball tournament at 37 consecutive appearances. Connecticut also continued its record streak of 11 consecutive Final Four appearances.

Tournament procedure

	
Pending any changes to the format, a total of 64 teams will enter the 2016 tournament. 32 automatic bids shall be awarded to each program that wins their conference's tournament. The remaining 36 bids are "at-large", with selections extended by the NCAA Selection Committee. The tournament is split into four regional tournaments, and each regional has teams seeded from 1 to 16, with the committee ostensibly making every region as comparable to the others as possible. The top-seeded team in each region plays the #16 team, the #2 team plays the #15, etc. (meaning where the two seeds add up to 17, that team will be assigned to play another).

The basis for the subregionals returned to the approach used between 1982 and 2002; the top sixteen teams, as chosen in the bracket selection process, hosted the first two rounds on campus.

The selection committee will also seed the entire field from 1 to 64.

2018 NCAA tournament schedule and venues
The first two rounds, also referred to as the subregionals, were played at the sites of the top 16 seeds, as was done in 2016 and 2017. The following are the sites selected to host the last four rounds of the 2018 tournament.

First and Second rounds (Subregionals)
 March 16–18
 KFC Yum! Center, Louisville, Kentucky (Host: University of Louisville)
 Thompson–Boling Arena, Knoxville, Tennessee (Host: University of Tennessee)
 Reed Arena, College Station, Texas (Host: Texas A&M University)
 Reynolds Coliseum, Raleigh, North Carolina (Host: North Carolina State University)
 Edmund P. Joyce Center, Notre Dame, Indiana (Host: University of Notre Dame)
 Colonial Life Arena, Columbia, South Carolina (Host: University of South Carolina)
 Matthew Knight Arena, Eugene, Oregon (Host: University of Oregon)
 Ferrell Center, Waco, Texas (Host: Baylor University)
 March 17–19
 Harry A. Gampel Pavilion, Storrs, Connecticut (Host: University of Connecticut)
 Stegeman Coliseum, Athens, Georgia (Host: University of Georgia)
 St. John Arena, Columbus, Ohio (Host: Ohio State University)
 Donald L. Tucker Civic Center, Tallahassee, Florida (Host: Florida State University)
 Humphrey Coliseum, Starkville, Mississippi (Host: Mississippi State University)
 Maples Pavilion, Stanford, California (Host: Stanford University)
 Pauley Pavilion, Los Angeles, California (Host: University of California, Los Angeles)
 Frank Erwin Center, Austin, Texas (Host: University of Texas at Austin)

Regional semifinals and finals (Sweet Sixteen and Elite Eight)

 March 23–25
 Kansas City regional, Sprint Center, Kansas City, Missouri (Host: Big 12)
 Lexington regional, Rupp Arena, Lexington, Kentucky (Host: University of Kentucky)
 March 24–26
 Albany regional, Times Union Center, Albany, New York (Hosts: MAAC)
 Spokane regional, Veterans Memorial Arena, Spokane, Washington (Host: University of Idaho)
National semifinals and Championship (Final Four and Championship)
March 30 and April 1
Nationwide Arena, Columbus, Ohio (Host: Ohio State University)

Subregionals tournament and automatic qualifiers

Selections for the 2018 NCAA Division I Women’s Basketball Championship were announced at 7 p.m. Eastern time, Monday, March 12 via ESPN.

The basis for the subregionals returned to the approach used between 1982 and 2002; the top sixteen teams, as chosen in the bracket selection process, hosted the first two rounds on campus.

A total of 64 teams entered the 2018 tournament. 32 automatic bids teams were given to teams that won their conference tournament. The remaining 32 teams were granted "at-large" bids, which were extended by the NCAA Selection Committee.

The selection committee also seeded the entire field from 1 to 64.

Automatic qualifiers
The following teams automatically qualified for the 2018 NCAA field by virtue of winning their conference's tournament.

Tournament seeds

Bracket
All times are listed as Eastern Daylight Time (UTC−4)
* – Denotes overtime period

Albany Regional – Albany, New York

Albany Regional Final

Albany Regional all tournament team
 Gabby Williams, UConn (MOP)
 Cierra Dillard, Buffalo
 A'ja Wilson, South Carolina
 Crystal Dangerfield, UConn
 Katie Lou Samuelson, UConn

Kansas City Regional – Kansas City, Missouri

Kansas City Regional final

Kansas City Regional all tournament team
 Teaira McCowan, Mississippi State (Co-MOP)
 Victoria Vivians, Mississippi State (Co-MOP)
 Kiara Leslie, NC State
 Jordin Canada, UCLA
 Monique Billings, UCLA

Lexington Regional – Lexington, Kentucky

Lexington Regional Final

Lexington Regional all tournament team
 Asia Durr, Louisville (MOP)
 Myisha Hines-Allen, Louisville
 Arica Carter, Louisville
 Sam Fuehring, Louisville
 Marie Gülich, Oregon State

Spokane Regional – Spokane, Washington

Spokane Regional Final

Spokane Regional all tournament team
 Arike Ogunbowale, Notre Dame (MOP)
 Marina Mabrey, Notre Dame
 Chennedy Carter, Texas A&M
 Sabrina Ionescu, Oregon
 Ruthy Hebard, Oregon

Final Four
During the Final Four round, regardless of the seeds of the participating teams, the champion of the top overall top seed's region (Connecticut's Albany Region) plays against the champion of the fourth-ranked top seed's region (Notre Dame's Spokane Region), and the champion of the second overall top seed's region (Mississippi State's Kansas City Region) plays against the champion of the third-ranked top seed's region (Louisville's Lexington Region).

Nationwide Arena – Columbus, Ohio

* – Denotes overtime period

Final Four

National Championship

Final Four all-tournament team
 Arike Ogunbowale, Notre Dame (MOP)
 Jessica Shepard, Notre Dame
 Victoria Vivians, Mississippi State
 Teaira McCowan, Mississippi State
 Napheesa Collier, Connecticut

Record by conference 

 The R64, R32, S16, E8, F4, CG, and NC columns indicate how many teams from each conference were in the round of 64 (first round), round of 32 (second round), Sweet 16, Elite Eight, Final Four, championship game, and national champion, respectively.
 The America East, Big Sky, Big South, Big West, Conference USA, Colonial, Horizon, Ivy League, MEAC, Missouri Valley, Mountain West, Northeast, Ohio Valley, Patriot, Southern, Southland, Summit, Sun Belt, SWAC, WAC and West Coast conferences each had one representative that was eliminated in the first round.

Media coverage

Television
ESPN had US television rights to all games during the tournament. During the first and second rounds, ESPN aired select games nationally on ESPN2, ESPNU, and ESPNews. All other games aired regionally on ESPN, ESPN2, or ESPN3 and were streamed online via WatchESPN. Most of the nation got whip-a-round coverage during this time, which allowed ESPN to rotate between the games and focus the nation on the game that had the closest score.

Studio host and analysts
Maria Taylor (Host)
Andy Landers (Analyst)
Rebecca Lobo (Analyst) (First, Second rounds, Final Four and National championship game)
Nell Fortner (Analyst) (Regionals, Final Four and National championship game)

Broadcast assignments

First & second rounds Friday/Sunday
Beth Mowins & Nell Fortner – Louisville, Kentucky
Brenda VanLengen & Carol Ross – Knoxville, Tennessee
Lowell Galindo & Andraya Carter – College Station, Texas
John Brickley & Mike Thibault – Raleigh, North Carolina
Roy Philpott & Brooke Weisbrod – Notre Dame, Indiana
Paul Sunderland & Steffi Sorensen – Columbia, South Carolina
Dave Pasch & LaChina Robinson – Eugene, Oregon
Eric Frede & Christy Thomaskutty – Waco, Texas
Sweet Sixteen & Elite Eight Friday/Sunday
Beth Mowins, Debbie Antonelli & Allison Williams – Lexington, Kentucky
Pam Ward, Gail Goestenkors & Courtney Lyle – Kansas City, Missouri 
Final Four
Adam Amin, Kara Lawson, Rebecca Lobo & Holly Rowe – Columbus, Ohio

First & second rounds Saturday/Monday
Adam Amin & Kara Lawson – Storrs, Connecticut
Melissa Lee & Amanda Butler – Athens, Georgia
Sam Gore & Christy Winters-Scott – Columbus, Ohio
Clay Matvick & Katie Smith – Tallahassee, Florida
Courtney Lyle & Tamika Catchings – Starkville, Mississippi
Elise Woodward & Dan Hughes – Stanford, California
Tiffany Greene & Chiney Ogwumike – Los Angeles, California
Pam Ward & Gail Goestenkors – Austin, Texas
Sweet Sixteen & Elite Eight Saturday/Monday
Adam Amin, Kara Lawson, Rebecca Lobo & Holly Rowe – Albany, New York
Dave Pasch, LaChina Robinson & Molly McGrath – Spokane, Washington
Championship
Adam Amin, Kara Lawson, Rebecca Lobo & Holly Rowe – Columbus, Ohio

Radio
Westwood One had exclusive radio rights to the entire tournament. Teams participating in the regional finals, Final Four, and Championship were allowed to have their own local broadcasts, but they weren’t allowed to stream those broadcasts online.

Regional finals Sunday
 Justin Kutcher & Ann Schatz – Lexington, Kentucky
 Ted Emrich & Krista Blunk –  Kansas City, Missouri
Final Four
 John Sadak, Debbie Antonelli, & Krista Blunk – Columbus, Ohio

Regional finals Monday
 John Sadak & Debbie Antonelli – Albany, New York
 Dick Fain & Kristen Kozlowski – Spokane, Washington
Championship
 John Sadak, Debbie Antonelli, & Krista Blunk – Columbus, Ohio

See also
 2018 NCAA Division I men's basketball tournament
 2018 NCAA Division II men's basketball tournament
 2018 NCAA Division III men's basketball tournament
 2018 NCAA Division II women's basketball tournament
 2018 Women's National Invitation Tournament
 2018 U Sports Women's Basketball Championship
 2018 National Invitation Tournament
 2018 NAIA Division I women's basketball tournament
 2018 NAIA Division II women's basketball tournament
 2018 NAIA Division I men's basketball tournament
 2018 NAIA Division II men's basketball tournament
 2018 Women's Basketball Invitational
 2018 College Basketball Invitational
 2018 CollegeInsider.com Postseason Tournament

References

External links
NCAA Women's Basketball Division I

NCAA tournament
NCAA Division I women's basketball tournament
NCAA Division I women's basketball tournament
NCAA Division I women's basketball tournament